Øysletta is a village in the municipality of Overhalla in Trøndelag county, Norway. It is located on the south shore of the river Namsen, along the now-defunct Namsos Line railway.

A geo-radar survey revealed in 2019 the presence of a group of Viking ship burials, the most significant of which appears to be over 8 m long. Due to COVID, excavations are planned in 2023, and will last for years. This is the first find of ship burials after the early 1900 excavation of the Øseberg ship, the archetype of the Viking ship, the centrepiece of the Viking Ship Museum in Oslo.

References

2. https://www.smithsonianmag.com/smart-news/archaeologists-use-georadar-tech-find-buried-viking-ship-norway-180973666/ 
Villages in Trøndelag
Overhalla